Lotud, also known as Dusun Lotud, is a shifting Austronesian language of Sabah, Malaysia.

References

Dusunic languages
Endangered Austronesian languages
Languages of Malaysia